The Joint Monitoring and Implementation Committee (JOMIC) is a Zimbabwean multipartisan panel that was first launched on January 30, 2009, pursuant of the 2008 Zimbabwean power-sharing agreement.

Goals
 "to ensure the implementation, in letter and spirit, of the Global Political Agreement
 "to assess the implementation of the Global Political Agreement from time to time and consider steps which might need to be taken to ensure the speedy and full implementation of the Agreement in its entirety
 "to receive reports and complaints in respect of any issue related to the implementation, enforcement and execution of the agreement
 "to serve as catalyst in creating and promoting an atmosphere of mutual trust and understanding between the parties
 "to promote continuing dialogue between the parties."

Composition

MDC-M 
 Welshman Ncube (co-chairperson)
 Frank Chamunorwa
 Edward Mkhosi
 Priscilla Misihairambwi-Mushonga

MDC-T 
 Elton Mangoma (co-chairperson)
 Elias Mudzuri
 Tabita Khumalo
 Innocent Changonda

ZANU PF 
 Nicholas Goche (co-chairperson)
 Patrick Chinamasa 
 Emmerson Mnangagwa 
 Oppah Muchinguri

References

2008 Zimbabwean general election
Organizations established in 2009
Organisations based in Zimbabwe